Bahram Dehghanyar (born July 7, 1965) is an Iranian musician and film composer.

His first work in Iranian Broadcasting governmental television was the score for a children's serial, Grandma's Hut (خونه‌ی مادربزرگه). He has also composed the scores for Patriarchy (پدرسالار), Spouses (همسران), The Green House (خانه‌ی سبز), and Hotel (هتل).

Biography

Early life

Bahram Dehghanyar was born on July 7, 1965 in Tehran, Iran. His father, General Shahab Dehghanyar was an officer in the army and his older brother is a skilled pianist.

Education

Return to Iran

TV series
2010s
Heyat Modireh (2018) (هیأت مدیره)
Dar Hashieh (2015) (در حاشیه)
Ab Paria (2013) (آب پریا)
My Villa (2012) (ویلای من)
Bitter Coffee (2010) (قهوه تلخ)
2000s
All My Children (2009)  (همه‌ی بچه‌های من )
Mozaffar's Treasure (2007) (Not released) (گنج مظفر )
1000-Faced Man (2007) (مرد هزارچهره )
Mozaffar's Garden (2006) (باغ مظفر )
"Hod Hod" Bookstore (2006) (کتابفروشی هدهد )
"Barareh" Nights (2005) (شبهای برره )
Fasten Your Seatbelts! (2002) (کمربندها را ببندید )
1990s
The Green House (1998) (خانه‌ی سبز )
Car No. Tehran-11 (1998) (۱۱ خودرو تهران )
Spouses (1994) (همسران )
The tales of "ZiZiGuLu" Children TV Series  (قصه‌های تابه‌تا:  زی‌زی‌گولو )
Hotel (هتل )
1980s
Once Upon a Time (زیر گنبد کبود )
"Ziba" Barbershop (1989) (آرایشگاه زیبا )
Patriarchy (پدرسالار )
Grandma's Hut (1985) Children TV Series  (خونه‌ی مادریزرگه )

Filmography
2000s
Burglary (TV movie) (2007) (سرقت )
"Bemani VII" (TV movie) (2007) (بمانی هفتم )
Mother (TV movie) (2007) (مادر )
Devil's Imitator (2007) (Not released) (مقلد شیطان )
Mr. Thief (2006) (آقای دزد )
The Performer (TV movie) (2006) (نوازنده )
"Mahya" (2006) (محیا )
Secrets (2005) (رازها )
At the Doors (2005) (دربه‌درها )
1990s
The Starry Sky (1999) (آسمان پرستاره )
Fragile Love (Glass Love) (1999) (عشق شيشه اي )
Legion (1998) (لژیون )
Beyond the Mirror (1997) (آن سوی آینه )
Invisible Webs (1997) (تارهای نامرئی)
The Nervure (1997) (شاهرگ )
"Ebrahim" (1996) (ابراهيم )
The Green Hell (1995) (جهنم سبز )
Cow Horn (1995) (شاخ گاو )
The City's Children (1991) (شهر در دست بچه‌ها)
1980s
The Inheritance (1988) (ارثيه )

Discography

Awards

References

External links

Bahram Dehghanyar's page on Facebook
Soureh Iranian Cinema Organization

1965 births
Living people
Iranian composers
Iranian film score composers
Iranian pianists
Iranian songwriters
21st-century pianists